Assinovskaya (Exa-Borze) is a rural locality (a stanitsa) in Sunzhensky District, Chechnya.

Administrative and municipal status 
Municipally, Assinovskaya is incorporated as Assinovskoye rural settlement. It is the administrative center of the municipality and is the only settlement included in it.

Geography 

The village of Assinovskaya is located on the left bank of the Assa River (hence the name).

The nearest settlements to Assinovskaya are Sernovodskoye in the north, Novy Sharoy in the east, Achkhoy-Martan in the south-east, Bamut in the south, and Berd-Yurt and Nesterovskaya in the west.

History 
The village of Assinovskaya was founded in 1847 on the land of the Karabulak aul of Akh-Borzoy. According to official maps at the time, the aul and the village existed simultaneously, so on the map of the for 1871, there are the village of Assinskaya and the aul of Akhbarzoy, which is located on the opposite (right) bank of the Assa river, with Assinovskaya on the left, at the mouth of the Zheltukha stream.

In the summer of 1992, the church in the village was attacked. About 30 attackers broke religious items, shot at the icons and images with machine guns, and raided the altar. In 1997, the new abbot of the church was killed in another attack, and the walls of the church were burned. In 2013, the rebuilding of the church was finally completed, and the building was reopened.

In 1994, the residents of the village wrote a letter to the former President of the Russian Federation, Boris Yeltsin, with a plea for help, and explaining the facts of robbery, kidnapping and murder against ethnic Russian residents of the village. On 28 March 1999 and 8 April 1999, two Orthodox priests in the village were kidnapped. Peter Sukhonosov, the Archpriest, was killed, and priest Sergey Potapov was released.

In 2003, the village of Assinovskaya, together with Sernovodskoye, were transferred to Chechnya.

Population 
 1939 Census: 6,004
 1959 Census: 7,314
 1970 Census: 7,492
 1979 Census: 7,020
 1990 Census: 6,969
 2002 Census: 10,248
 2010 Census: 10,184
 2019 estimate: 10,992

According to the 2010 Census, the majority of residents of Assinovskaya (10,058 or 98.76%) were ethnic Chechens, with 126 people (1.24%) coming from other ethnic backgrounds.

References 

Rural localities in Sunzhensky District